Arctophila is the scientific name of two groups of organisms. It can refer to:

Arctophila (fly), a subgenus of flies in the family Syrphidae
Arctophila (plant), a genus of plants in the family Poaceae